Since 2001, the appearance of plates has changed - these must now contain the national symbol (the "Soyombo") in red, to the left of the numbers, and - between the digits and letters - the Mongolian oval (MNG).

The first two letters of the three-letter suffix indicate the province (or aimag in Mongolian) where the vehicle was registered:

References 

Mongolia
Mongolia transport-related lists
Road transport in Mongolia